Eve Wiltshaw  (23 January 1927 – 13 May 2008) was a British physician who was a researcher and consultant at the Royal Marsden Hospital. She was an expert in medical oncology, and led the United Kingdom's first clinical trials of cisplatin. In 1998, she wrote A History of the Royal Marsden Hospital.

Research and career 
In 1955, Wiltshaw joined the Royal Marsden Hospital, where she established the Sarcoma Unit, which provided multi-disciplinary care to people with cancer. 

After the 1970 discovery that cisplatin was an effective anti-cancer drug, Wiltshaw was involved with the discovery of chemotherapy. She ran the clinical trials of cisplatin at the Royal Marsden, the first trial of the drug in the United Kingdom. Despite the drug causing some side effects (particularly kidney toxicity and nausea), it was effective for people with ovarian cancer. In the years that followed, researchers looked to develop anti-cancer drugs that were as effective but caused fewer adverse effects. Eventually researchers identified carboplatin, and Wiltshaw led the clinical trials that showed it was just as effective as cisplatin.

Wiltshaw was awarded an Order of the British Empire for her contributions to cancer care.

Personal life 
After Wiltshaw died in 2008, the Royal Marsden Hospital named a ward in her honour.

Selected publications

References 

1927 births
2008 deaths
20th-century British medical doctors
British women medical doctors
Physicians of the Royal Marsden Hospital
20th-century women physicians
Members of the Order of the British Empire